Alathur State assembly constituency is one of the 140 state legislative assembly constituencies in Kerala state in southern India. It is also one of the 7 state legislative assembly constituencies included in the Alathur Lok Sabha constituency. As of the 2021 assembly elections, the current MLA is K. D. Prasenan of CPI(M).

Local self governed segments
Alathur Niyama Sabha constituency is composed of the following local self governed segments:

Members of Legislative Assembly
The following list contains all members of Kerala Legislative Assembly who have represented Alathur Niyamasabha Constituency during the period of various assemblies:

Key

Election results
Percentage change (±%) denotes the change in the number of votes from the immediate previous election.

Niyamasabha election 2021

Niyama Sabha election 2016
There were  registered voters in Alathur Constituency for the 2016 Kerala Niyamasabha Election.

Niyamasabha election 2011 
There were  registered voters in the constituency for the 2011 election.

Niyamasabha election 2006

2006 Kerala Legislative Assembly election

Total votes: 157841

Votes polled: 111629

Rejected & missing votes: 17

2001 Kerala Legislative Assembly election

Total votes: 154382

Votes polled: 112447

Rejected & missing votes: 45

Mr. CHENTHAMARAKSHAN elected with a margin of 12505 votes.

1996 Kerala Legislative Assembly election

Total votes: 146774

Votes polled: 102725

Rejected & missing votes: 1771

Mr. C. K. RAJENDRAN elected with a margin of 12166 votes

1991 Kerala Legislative Assembly election

Total electorate: 136727

Votes polled: 102439

A. V. Gopinathan Nair (Cong-I) declared elected by a margin of 338 votes.

1987 Kerala Legislative Assembly election

Total electorate: 116246

Votes polled: 90401 

C. K. Rajendran (CPIM) declared elected by a margin of 1211 votes.

1982 Kerala Legislative Assembly election

Total electorate: 95522

Votes polled: 70951 

C. T. Krishnan (CPI-M) elected by a margin of 11314 votes.

Niyamasabha election 1952

See also
 Alathur
 Palakkad district
 List of constituencies of the Kerala Legislative Assembly
 2016 Kerala Legislative Assembly election

References 

Assembly constituencies of Kerala

State assembly constituencies in Palakkad district